The District of  Montgomeryshire or Montgomery was one of three local government districts of the county of Powys, Wales, from 1974 until 1996. The district had an identical area to the previous administrative county of Montgomeryshire. The district was abolished in 1996, with Powys County Council taking over its functions.

History
The district was formed as Montgomery on 1 April 1974 under the Local Government Act 1972. It covered the administrative county of Montgomeryshire, which was abolished at the same time. The new district replaced the previous ten district level authorities in Montgomeryshire:

Forden Rural District
Llanfyllin Municipal Borough
Llanfyllin Rural District
Llanidloes Municipal Borough
Machynlleth Rural District
Machynlleth Urban District
Montgomery Municipal Borough
Newtown and Llanllwchaiarn Urban District
Newtown and Llanidloes Rural District
Welshpool Municipal Borough

By 1986 the council had changed its name from Montgomery to Montgomeryshire.

The district was abolished by the Local Government (Wales) Act 1994, with its functions transferring to Powys County Council on 1 April 1996.

Political control
The first election to the council was held in 1973, initially operating as a shadow authority before coming into its powers on 1 April 1974. A majority of the seats on the council were held by independents throughout the council's existence.

Premises
The council was based at Neuadd Maldwyn, the former headquarters of Montgomeryshire County Council, which had been built in 1931 on Severn Road in Welshpool. The council also had area offices in Llanidloes, Machynlleth and at Newtown Hall Park in Newtown. After the council's abolition in 1996 Neuadd Maldwyn and Newtown Hall Park served as area offices for Powys County Council. Neuadd Maldwyn closed in 2019, with Newtown Hall Park now serving as Powys County Council's main area office in the Montgomeryshire area.

References

History of Powys
Montgomeryshire
Districts of Wales abolished in 1996
1974 establishments in Wales